Malibu International Film Festival (MIFF) is a film festival and non-profit organization, established in 1997, that showcases independent American and international films. The MIFF line-up includes world premieres and U.S. premieres with the focus on introducing new filmmakers to the film industry.

The festival has honored and featured many major actors and film personalities, including James Cameron and Malcolm McDowell.

Awards
Best Documentary
Award for Best Short Film
Award for Best Live Action Short Film
Award for Best Animation 
Student Filmmaking Award
Audience Choice Award for Best Film
Special Jury Selection

References

External links 

Film festivals in California
Cinema of Southern California
Tourist attractions in Malibu, California
Film festivals established in 1997
1997 establishments in California